Michael Golden is an American retired ice hockey forward who was an All-American for the University of Maine.

Career
Golden was a star player for Reading Memorial High School in Massachusetts, leading his team to a Middlesex League championship while scoring nearly 3 points per game. The Edmonton Oilers ended up selecting him in the 2nd round of the 1983 NHL Entry Draft and he began attending the University of New Hampshire in the fall. Golden's tenure in Durham lasted just 7 games and he left mid-season to play for both a junior-B team and at the World Junior Championships.

Golden ended up transferring to Maine and was forced to sit out the entire 1984–85 season due to NCAA requirements. He debuted for the Black Bears the following year and slowly worked his way to the top of the roster. Golden helped the team reach their first NCAA Tournament in 1987 and was named team captain for his senior season. 1988 was a new high for the program as they finished first in the Hockey East standings with Golden finishing second on the team and sixth in the nation in scoring. Maine received the top eastern seed in 1988 and won their quarterfinal match to make the program's first Frozen Four.

While he was in college, Golden had been traded by the Oilers to the New York Rangers in a package that included Reijo Ruotsalainen. He began his professional career in the Rangers' farm system and played well for two years. His scoring diminished in 1991 as he moved between three teams and he retired as a player following the year.

Golden returned home and hung around his old high school team, eventually joining as a volunteer assistant. He left for a few years after the turn of the century but returned as the head coach for the women's team in 2009. He built the team into a power in short order, leading the team to its first state championship in 2015 with a record of 22–2–0. Work commitments unfortunately forced him to resign from his position following the year but Golden had already left an indelible mark on the school.

Statistics

Regular season and playoffs

International

Awards and honors

References

External links

1965 births
Living people
Ice hockey people from Boston
American men's ice hockey forwards
New Hampshire Wildcats men's ice hockey players
Maine Black Bears men's ice hockey players
AHCA Division I men's ice hockey All-Americans
Denver Rangers players
Flint Spirits players
Albany Choppers players
Milwaukee Admirals players
Binghamton Rangers players
Edmonton Oilers draft picks
People from Reading, Massachusetts